Murad Giray (reigned 1678- 1683; lived 1627–1696) (Crimean Tatar: Murad Geray مراد كراى, Turkish: Murat Giray) was a Khan of the Crimean Khanate between the first and second reigns of his cousin Selim I Giray. His father was Mubarek, one of the many sons of Selâmet I Giray (1608-1610). Three of his uncles were Khans. None of his descendants became Khans.  During his Khanship, his nureddin was the future Khan Saadet III Giray and his Kalga was Tokhtamysh, a brother of future Khan Safa Giray of Crimea.

From 1659 to 1663 he was nureddin during the second reign of Mehmed IV Giray. He then retired to Istanbul. In 1678 the Turks made him Khan in place of his cousin Selim I Giray who had performed poorly at the siege of Chyhyryn.  This was at the time of the Russo-Turkish War (1676–1681). After more fighting, in which Crimea was involved, the Treaty of Bakhchisarai (1681) recognized Ottoman control over western Ukraine.

In 1682 the Ottoman Empire went to war with the Holy Roman Empire. The Ottomans laid siege to the important city of Vienna. This led to the disastrous Ottoman defeat at the Battle of Vienna in 1683. The 40,000 Crimean troops performed poorly and Murad was removed. After returning from the hajj pilgrimage, Murad retired to an estate near Yambol in modern Bulgaria and died in 1696. He was followed by Haji II who reigned briefly until Selim was restored.

Sources 
Henry Hoyle Howorth, History of the Mongols, 1880, Part 2, pp. 562–563
Олекса Гайворонский «Созвездие Гераев». Симферополь, 2003.
 

Crimean Khans
1627 births
1696 deaths
People of the Great Turkish War
17th-century rulers in Europe